Events from the year 1773 in Russia

Incumbents
 Monarch – Catherine II

Events

 
 National Mineral Resources University
 Bazilionai parish school
 Pugachev's Rebellion begins.

Births

Deaths

References

1773 in Russia
Years of the 18th century in the Russian Empire